Augustus Frisbie House is a historic home located at Salisbury Center in Herkimer County, New York. It was built in 1805 and is a two-story, five bay, gable roofed frame residence with a one-story, gable roofed wing in the Federal style. The main block is over a cut limestone foundation above a full basement.  It is preserved  as a museum of local history by the Salisbury Historical Society.

It was listed on the National Register of Historic Places in 1999.

References

Houses on the National Register of Historic Places in New York (state)
History museums in New York (state)
Federal architecture in New York (state)
Houses completed in 1805
Historical society museums in New York (state)
Museums in Herkimer County, New York
Houses in Herkimer County, New York
1805 establishments in New York (state)
National Register of Historic Places in Herkimer County, New York